Gary Bakewell (born December 1968) is a Scottish television actor who is best known for his role as Paul McCartney in the film Backbeat.

As well as twice portraying Paul McCartney (in Backbeat and The Linda McCartney Story) he has appeared in a number of television series including Chef!, Doctors and Spooks. He appears in the Gallifrey series of audio dramas, spin-offs of the television series Doctor Who by Big Finish Productions.

Bakewell has done work as a voice-over artist and has worked as an Audio Describer.

References 

British male television actors
Living people
1968 births